Jean-Émile Buland (25 October 1857, Paris – 15 February 1938, Paris), was a French painter, engraver, lithographer and illustrator.

Life and work 
He was born to Jean-Marie Buland (1825-1895), an engraver, and his wife from Luxembourg, Suzanne, née Wagener.  His older brother, Jean-Eugène, was a painter.

In 1875, he enrolled at the École des Beaux-Arts, where he studied with the painter, Alexandre Cabanel, and the engraver, Louis-Pierre Henriquel-Dupont. In 1880, he won the Prix de Rome for engraving, and spent the years 1881 to 1884 studying at the villa Medici. In 1886, he married Louise Godefroy. They had one daughter.

He was awarded a silver medal at the Exposition Universelle of 1900, and a first-class medal at the Salon of 1901. Two years later, he was named a Knight in the Legion of Honor.

In 1925, he was elected to the Académie des Beaux-Arts, where he took Seat #2 for engraving, succeeding Charles Albert Waltner (deceased).

References

Further reading 
 André Dauchez, Notice sur la vie et les œuvres d'Émile Buland, lue dans la séance de l'Institut de France le 17 février 1940, Paris, Institut de France, 1940.
 Armand Boutillier du Retail, Alphonse Defrasse, Philippe Mercier, "Documentation sur Jean-Émile Buland", In: L'Illustration, Paris, Larousse mensuel, 1938.

External links 

 Biographical data and references from the Comité des travaux historiques et scientifiques @ La France Savante

1857 births
1938 deaths
French engravers
Prix de Rome winners
Recipients of the Legion of Honour
Members of the Académie des beaux-arts
Engravers from Paris